The Food Act 1981 was an Act of Parliament in New Zealand. It is administered by the Ministry for Primary Industries.

The Food Act 2014 replaced the Food Act progressively over three years from when it came into force in 2016.

Provisions 
Whereas previous food legislation in New Zealand had primarily focused on the purity of foods, the Food Act 1981 was a consumer protection law focused on the regulation of food sales, advertising, hygiene, and safety standards. It was the principal act governing food safety in the country until its repeal and replacement by the Food Act 2014, which came into full effect on 28 February 2019.

Alongside the Food Hygiene Regulations 1974 and the Health Act 1956, it mandated that the manufacturing, packaging, processing, and sale of food occur in registered food premises.

Under the provisions of the Food Act 1981, Governor General of New Zealand David Beattie presided over an Order in Council to introduce the Dietary Supplements Regulations 1985, as a way to regulate dietary supplements.

See also
Food safety in New Zealand

References

External links
Text of the Act
Food Act 1981 at the Ministry for Primary Industries

Food law
Food safety in New Zealand
Statutes of New Zealand
1981 in New Zealand law
1981 in New Zealand
1980s in New Zealand